is a railway station on the Kashii Line operated by JR Kyushu in Kasuya, Fukuoka Prefecture, Japan.

Lines

Station layout 
The station, which is unstaffed, consists of two side platforms serving two tracks on an embankment. The station building houses a waiting room and has a glassed-in area with an automatic ticket machine. Bike sheds are provided at the base of the embankment from which a flight of steps leads up to the station building. Access to the opposite platform is by means of a level crossing with steps at both ends to the platforms.

Adjacent stations

History
On 19 September 1942, the company, now renamed the Hakata Bay Railway and Steamship Company, with a few other companies, merged into the Kyushu Electric Tramway. Three days later, the new conglomerate, which had assumed control of the station, became the Nishi-Nippon Railroad (Nishitetsu). Japanese Government Railways (JGR) took over control of the station and the track which served it was designated the Kashii Line. With the privatization of Japanese National Railways (JNR), the successor of JGR, on 1 April 1987, JR Kyushu took over control of the station.

Shortly after opening, the station was closed on 21 July 1905. Tabi-ishi was closed on 15 December 1960 and Shime, together with the entire branch line, was closed on 1 January 1985.

On 14 March 2015, the station, along with others on the line, became a remotely managed "Smart Support Station". Under this scheme, although the station became unstaffed, passengers using the automatic ticket vending machines or ticket gates could receive assistance via intercom from staff at a central support centre.

Passenger statistics
In fiscal 2016, the station was used by an average of 581 passengers daily (boarding passengers only), and it ranked 229th among the busiest stations of JR Kyushu.

References

External links
Sakado (JR Kyushu)

Railway stations in Fukuoka Prefecture
Railway stations in Japan opened in 1904